Alite Island is an island in the Solomon Islands; it is located in Malaita Province. The estimated terrain elevation above sea level is 6 metres.

References

Islands of the Solomon Islands